Claude Hêche (born  20 December 1952) is a Swiss politician. He was a member of the Council of States from 2007 to 2019 and served as President of the National Council in the 2014-2015 session.

Hêche was elected to the Council of States by the Canton of Jura in 2007. He is a member of the Social Democratic Party (SPS/PSS). From 1995 to 2007, he was a member of the government of the canton of Jura.

References

External links

1952 births
Living people
Members of the Council of States (Switzerland)
Presidents of the Council of States (Switzerland)
Social Democratic Party of Switzerland politicians